Rajapura or Rajapuram was the capital of the ancient Kamboja Kingdom mentioned in the Mahabharata. Karna led a war expedition against the Kamboja and some other tribes of the Uttarapatha a little time before the Kurukshetra war i.e. Karana Rajapuram gatva Kamboja Nirjitastvaya. The Chinese pilgrim  Xuanzang who travelled to India in the 7th century refers to Hoshepulo(曷羅闍補羅, roughly hat-la-tsia-pu-la in 7th century Chinese) which has been identified as Rajapura of Sanskrit tradition by Watters and others.

See also 
 Kambojas
 Mahajanapadas
 History of India
 History of Hinduism

References 

Ancient Indian cities